is a Japanese international school in Nam Từ Liêm, Hanoi, Vietnam. It serves elementary school and junior high school.

It was established in April 1996, with an initial enrollment of 13 students. It was first located at the Hanoi University of Communications and Transport with a teaching staff of five members.

See also
 Japanese people in Vietnam
 Japan–Vietnam relations
 Japanese language education in Vietnam

References

Further reading

 Independent articles
 Morishita, Kiyoko (森下 規代子; Osaka University of Comprehensive Children Education). "A report of the research on Vietnam Japanese School" (Archive) (ベトナム日本人学校 調査報告). Journal of Osaka University of Comprehensive Children Education (大阪総合保育大学紀要) (3), 157-168, 2009-03-20. Info at CiNii. - English abstract available on pages 10-12 of 12
 Articles by former staff members
 Ishikawa, Yasuo (石川 泰雅; 前ハノイ日本人学校教諭・埼玉県埼玉郡宮代町立須賀中学校教諭). "ハノイ日本人学校における特別活動の取り組みについて : 児童一人ひとりを生かす学校行事を目指して." 在外教育施設における指導実践記録 24, 27-31, 2001. Tokyo Gakugei University. Info at CiNii.
 青谷 正人 (前ハノイ日本人学校:北海道沙流郡日高町立厚賀中学校). "ハノイ日本人学校における進路資料室開設と進路便り発行への取り組み(その他)" (Archive). 在外教育施設における指導実践記録 33, 219-222, 2010-12-24. Tokyo Gakugei University. Info at CiNii.
 武山 昌裕 (北海道旭川市立東五条小学校・ハノイ日本人学校(前)). "ハノイ日本人学校における国際理解教育(第4章国際理解教育・現地理解教育)." 在外教育施設における指導実践記録 27, 53-56, 2004. Tokyo Gakugei University. Info at CiNii.

External links
 Japanese School of Hanoi 
 The Japanese School of Hanoi Junior High School  
 "18-6hanoi.pdf" (Archive) - On the website of the government of Tottori Prefecture

International schools in Hanoi
Japanese international schools in Vietnam
Hanoi
1996 establishments in Vietnam
Educational institutions established in 1996